Namakkal railway station (station code: NMKL) is a railway station situated in the Town of Namakkal in the Indian state of Tamil Nadu. The station is an intermediate station on the newly commissioned Salem–Karur line which became operational in May 2013. The station is operated by the Southern Railway zone of the Indian Railways and comes under the Salem railway division.

Traffic
The station is a commercial halt for all trains passing through it.

History
Hon'ble MP Kulandaivelu demanded this railway line 1979 in Parliament written question.

References

External links
 

Salem railway division
Railway stations in Namakkal district
Railway stations opened in 2013